To Walk a Middle Course is the second studio album by American heavy metal band Kylesa. Released on March 22, 2005 by Prosthetic Records, it was produced by English record producer Alex Newport, who is known for his projects Fudge Tunnel and Nailbomb.

Music and composition
To Walk a Middle Course incorporates elements of sludge metal, alternative metal and stoner rock. The album features a variety of metal and non-metal influences, including doom metal, stoner rock, punk rock and gothic rock. AllMusic critic Alex Henderson wrote, "Elements of Neurosis, Eyehategod, Orange Goblin, and Black Sabbath assert themselves, as do elements of the Melvins, Lydia Lunch, and X. In fact, Kylesa often employ the punky male vocals/punky female vocals contrast that worked so well for X in the '80s, although they're a much heavier band." Blabbermouth.net's Keith Bergman stated that the band "are all about throwing murky riffs, bottom-of-a-well screams, and lugubrious rhythms into a dour punk stew that name-checks everyone from old Neurosis to Amebix to Eyehategod to Unsane. Exclaim! critic Jill Mikkelson thought that the record has "prolonged, tension building moments that sound similar to Keelhaul, mid-tempo riffing reminiscent of Mastodon and more emotionally driven, rock-chord progressions that add dynamic to the mud."

Critical reception

The album generally received mixed-to-positive reviews from music critics. AllMusic's Alex Henderson wrote: "Kylesa can be very dissonant, noisy, and discordant, but they aren't that way all the time; moments of sensory assault can easily be followed by passages that are moody, eerie, and darkly atmospheric." Henderson further stated that the record "isn't as consistent as it could have been, but more often than not, Kylesa's risk-taking pays off on this intriguing, if uneven, effort." Keith Bergman of Blabbermouth.net commented: "After a few tracks, Kylesa's zanily unpredictable mishmash of sound becomes… well… predictable. You'll get the idea after ten minutes — this sort of dirty, dreadlocked psychedelia blown out of the basement of an abandoned punk squat, hoarsely shouted, with riffs that sound apocalyptic in a blown-tube-amp kind of way." Exclaim! critic Jill Mikkelson wrote: "This record will appeal to fans of stoner rock but isn't anything special."

Track listing

Personnel
Kylesa
 Phillip Cope – guitar, sampling, vocals
 Laura Pleasants – guitar, vocals
 Corey Barhorst – bass, sampling, vocals
 Brandon Baltzley – drums

Production
 Alex Newport – audio engineer, production
 Louie Teran – mastering
 Drew Speziale – cover art

References

External links
 

2005 albums
Kylesa albums
Prosthetic Records albums
Albums produced by Alex Newport